Pegasides (singular: pegasis) were nymphs of Greek mythology connected with wells and springs, specifically those that the mythical horse Pegasus created by striking the ground with his hooves.

Background
According to Greek mythological tradition the winged horse Pegasus was the son of Poseidon, sea and river god of the Greeks, equivalent to the Roman Neptune. The hero Bellerophon needed the untamed Pegasus to help him defeat the monster Chimera. Hence, while Pegasus was drinking at the spring Pirene in Corinth, Bellerophon caught him. Pegasus, startled, struck a rock with his hoof, creating the spring Hippocrene on Mount Helicon.

The Pegasides
The name pegasides (plural form of the Greek feminine adjective pegasis) literally means "originating from or linked with Pegasus". Hence, in poetry, the waters and streams of Hippocrene and other springs that arose from the hoofprints of Pegasus are called pegasides. The Muses are likewise called pegasides because the spring Hippocrene was sacred to them. Nymphs in general, if associated with springs and brooks, may be called pegasides: thus pegasis, the singular form, is applied by the Roman poet Ovid as a by-name or adjective to the nymph Oenone, daughter of the river-god Cebrenus.

Pegasis is used by the Greek author Quintus Smyrnaeus as the name of a nymph who had sex with the Trojan prince Emathion and gave birth beside the river Granicus to Atymnius. The latter was eventually killed by Odysseus in the Trojan War.

Gallery

Notes

References
 
 
 
 
 
 
 Publius Ovidius Naso, The Epistles of Ovid. London. J. Nunn, Great-Queen-Street; R. Priestly, 143, High-Holborn; R. Lea, Greek-Street, Soho; and J. Rodwell, New-Bond-Street. 1813. Online version at the Perseus Digital Library.
 Publius Ovidius Naso. Amores, Epistulae, Medicamina faciei femineae, Ars amatoria, Remedia amoris. Edition by R. Ehwald; Rudolphi Merkelii; Leipzig. B. G. Teubner. 1907. Latin text available at the Perseus Digital Library.
 Publius Ovidius Naso, Tristia (The Early Letters from Tomis AD 8-12) translated by A. S. Kline. © Copyright 2003. Online version at the Topos Text Project.
 Publius Ovidius Naso, Tristia. Arthur Leslie Wheeler. Cambridge, MA. Harvard University Press. 1939. Latin text available at the Perseus Digital Library.
 Quintus Smyrnaeus, The Fall of Troy translated by Way. A. S. Loeb Classical Library Volume 19. London: William Heinemann, 1913. Online version at theio.com
 Quintus Smyrnaeus, The Fall of Troy. Arthur S. Way. London: William Heinemann; New York: G.P. Putnam's Sons. 1913. Greek text available at the Perseus Digital Library.
 
 

Naiads
Nymphs